Gert Michael Weil Wiesenborn (born January 3, 1960 in Puerto Montt) is a retired Chilean shot putter of German ancestry, who dominated the sport on the South American scene during the 1980s and early 1990s.

His best performance at a global event was a sixth place at the 1988 Olympic Games. His personal best was 20.90, achieved in Wirges 1986.

Weil is married to Colombian Olympic medalist Ximena Restrepo.  Their daughter, Martina Weil, is a track and field athlete at the University of Tennessee after winning the 400 meters in the South American U23 championships and setting a Chilean national record in the event.

International competitions

References

1960 births
Living people
People from Puerto Montt
Chilean male shot putters
Chilean male hammer throwers
Chilean male discus throwers
Olympic athletes of Chile
Athletes (track and field) at the 1984 Summer Olympics
Athletes (track and field) at the 1988 Summer Olympics
Athletes (track and field) at the 1992 Summer Olympics
Athletes (track and field) at the 1996 Summer Olympics
Pan American Games gold medalists for Chile
Pan American Games medalists in athletics (track and field)
Athletes (track and field) at the 1979 Pan American Games
Athletes (track and field) at the 1983 Pan American Games
Athletes (track and field) at the 1987 Pan American Games
Athletes (track and field) at the 1991 Pan American Games
Athletes (track and field) at the 1995 Pan American Games
World Athletics Championships athletes for Chile
Chilean people of German descent
South American Games gold medalists for Chile
South American Games silver medalists for Chile
South American Games bronze medalists for Chile
South American Games medalists in athletics
Competitors at the 1982 Southern Cross Games
Competitors at the 1990 South American Games
Competitors at the 1994 South American Games
Medalists at the 1983 Pan American Games
Medalists at the 1987 Pan American Games
Medalists at the 1991 Pan American Games
Medalists at the 1995 Pan American Games
Chilean sports coaches
Athletics (track and field) coaches
21st-century Chilean people